The Long Island PGA Championship is a professional golf tournament played on Long Island, New York. It is sponsored by the Metropolitan section of the PGA of America. The current title of the event is the MasterCard Long Island PGA Championship.

History 
During the first half of the tournament's history, Al Brosch had great success at the event, winning the event nine times. By the end of this period, the event was jokingly referred to as a "benefit" for Brosch as he so reliably picked up the first place cheque.

In 1975, it transformed into a match play event. The champion was exempt but otherwise the field was determined during a one-round qualifier. In 1978, the local supermarket King Kullen began sponsoring the tournament. They helped provide a record $10,000 purse. King Kullen became the title sponsor in 1980. The tournament has been subsequently sponsored by Union Savings Bank, TaylorMade, Cobra Golf, and Mastercard.

Winners 

Source:

1 Borek defeated Wright on the first sudden-death playoff hole with a par

2 Brown (71) defeated Mayfield (73) in an 18-hole playoff

3 Cici (74) defeated Mallon (75) in an 18-hole playoff

4 Hines (73) and Klein (73) defeated Catropa (79) in the first 18-hole playoff. Hines defeated Klein in the second playoff

References

External links 
PGA of America – Metropolitan section

Golf in New York (state)
Sports in Long Island
PGA of America sectional tournaments
Recurring sporting events established in 1935
1935 establishments in New York (state)